George Chambers (February 24, 1786 – March 25, 1866) was an Anti-Masonic member of the U.S. House of Representatives from Pennsylvania.

George Chambers was born in Chambersburg, Pennsylvania.  He graduated from Princeton College in 1804, studied law, was admitted to the bar in 1807 and commenced practice in Chambersburg.

Chambers was elected as an Anti-Masonic candidate to the Twenty-third and Twenty-fourth Congresses.  After his time in Congress, he resumed the practice of law and was a member of the State constitutional convention in 1837.  He was appointed a justice of the Pennsylvania Supreme Court on April 12, 1851, which position he held until it was vacated by constitutional provision. From 1849 to 1858 he served as a trustee of Lafayette College. He died in Chambersburg in 1866.  Interment in Falling Spring Presbyterian Churchyard.

References

Sources

The Political Graveyard

1786 births
1866 deaths
People from Chambersburg, Pennsylvania
Anti-Masonic Party members of the United States House of Representatives from Pennsylvania
Justices of the Supreme Court of Pennsylvania
Pennsylvania lawyers
Princeton University alumni
19th-century American politicians
Lafayette College trustees
19th-century American judges
19th-century American lawyers